The Grand Prix de Futsal is an international futsal competition of the same kind of the FIFA Futsal World Cup but with invited nations and held annually in Brazil. It was first held in 2005.

History
In 2007, the sixteen participating nations are divided in the first stage in four groups of four teams each. The nations play against each other once within their respective groups, and the two best placed teams of each group qualify to the second stage, which is the quarter-finals. The quarter-finals winners qualify to the semifinals. The semifinal winners play the final, while the losers play the third-place playoff.

Five teams took part in the 2018 tournament between 30 January and 4 February 2018.

Results

Summaries

Performance by nations

Participating nations
Legend
1st — Champions
2nd — Runners-up
3rd — Third place
4th — Fourth place
5th-16th — Fifth to Sixteenth place
Q — Qualified for upcoming tournament

All-time table

Results by confederation

AFC (Asia)

CAF (Africa)

CONCACAF (North, Central America and the Caribbean)

CONMEBOL (South America)

OFC (Oceania)

UEFA (Europe)

References

External links
 http://www.futsalplanet.com/news/news-01.asp?id=20795 

 
International futsal competitions hosted by Brazil
International futsal competitions
Recurring sporting events established in 2005
2005 establishments in Brazil